The Mysterious Footprints (Danish: De mystiske fodspor) is a 1918 Danish silent film directed by A.W. Sandberg and starring Carl Brisson.

Cast
 Carl Brisson as Erik  
 Anton De Verdier as Carl  
 Else Frölich as Marion  
 Henny Lauritzen as Countess Bleking  
 Peter Nielsen as Sverre Bjerke  
 Ulla Nielsen as Girl  
 Lizzie Ruge as Girl  
 Charles Willumsen as Servant

References

Bibliography
 Marguerite Engberg. Den danske stumfilm 1903-1930: Et index. Danske Filmmuseum, 1968.

External links

1918 films
Danish silent films
Films directed by A. W. Sandberg
Nordisk Film films
Danish black-and-white films